"Gartan Mother's Lullaby" is an old Irish song and poem written by Herbert Hughes and Seosamh Mac Cathmhaoil, first published in Songs of Uladh [Ulster] in 1904.
Hughes collected the traditional melody in Donegal the previous year and Campbell wrote the lyrics. The song is a lullaby by a mother, from the parish of Gartan in County Donegal. The song refers to a number of figures in Irish mythology, places in Ireland and words in the Irish language.

Pronunciation
Aoibheall, (pronounced "ee-val") commonly known as Aoibhinn the Beautiful, is the queen of the Northern Fairies.
The Green Man, (or Fear Glas in Irish) it is said if you see him in the morning, "no ill follows"; but if at night, death or some other terrible misfortune will surely overtake you. He is sometimes called Fear Liath, or the Grey Man.
Siabhra, is a generic term for an Irish fairy of any kind. In ancient writings the Tuatha de Danann, or little magicians of the Pagan Irish, were called "siabhra" without distinction.
Tearmann, Irish for Termon, a village near Gartan in Donegal.
Leanbhan, is an old Irish word for little child. (leanbh is Irish for child +án leanbhán is its diminutive.)

Recordings
2016 - UCD Choral Scholars covered on the album "Invisible Stars"  
2016 - Lisa Cuthbert covered on the album Paramour
2011 - Screaming Orphans covered on the album The Jacket's Green
2011 - Deirdre Shannon covered on the album Anamcheol
2010 - Peter Roberts covered on the album Love and the Ferryman 
2010 - Fionnuala Sherry covered on the album Songs From Before
2007 -Tracey Rose Brown covered on the album " Songs In The Mist"
2006 - Órla Fallon, covered on the album The Water Is Wide
2002 - Spiral Dance, covered on the album Notes of Being
2002 - Kerstin Blodig, covered on the album Valivann
2000 - Meryl Streep, recorded for the album For Our Children: 10th Anniversary
1992 - Kim Robertson, recorded for the album Tender Shepherd
1991 - Paddy Reilly, on his album The Gold and Silver Days
1977 - Alba, on their album "Alba"
1972 - The Dubliners, on their album Double Dubliners
1969 - The Corries, appears on their album Strings and Things
1963 - The Ian Campbell Folk Group, appears on their album This Is The Ian Campbell Folk Group!
1959 - Deirdre O'Callaghan, appears on their album Folk Songs From Erin
1958 - Mary O'Hara, appears on their album Songs Of Ireland

References

Lullabies
Irish songs
Irish poems
Irish folk songs
1904 songs